Geir Hallsteinsson (born 7 August 1946) is an Icelandic former handball player who competed in the 1972 Summer Olympics.

References

1946 births
Living people
Geir Hallsteinsson
Geir Hallsteinsson
Handball players at the 1972 Summer Olympics